Ali Ki Ammi is a 2015 Pakistani drama serial directed by Syed Wajahat Hussain, produced by A&B Entertainment, and written by Ali Moeen. The drama stars Samiya Mumtaz, Asad Malik, and Zainab Qayyum in lead roles, and was first aired on 16 November 2016, on Geo Entertainment, where it airs on Monday at 8:00 p.m. It is based on the true story of a mother and a son, showing their tribulations and a mother's unconditional love.

Synopsis 
Ali Ki Ammi is based on the true story of a mother's unconditional love for her son. The story revolves around Maryam, a strong and mature woman from a respectable family who somehow gets manipulated as she falls in love with Nadir. Nadir is a middle-aged businessman who is already married with two grown-up kids, He lies to Maryam about his past and marries her. Maryam's marriage is not well received by her family and they break all the ties with her. Upon knowing about Nadir's marriage with Maryam, his first wife Sobia and his mother take up arms against Maryam. Sobia's vicious planning to get rid of Maryam makes her life complicated. Not only does she find it difficult to adjust to her new household but she is forced to live in a shabby neighbourhood alone. Maryam's faith in life is restored when she gives birth to her son Ali. She decides to provide a good lifestyle to Ali and despite being uneducated, Maryam provides Ali with the best education and tries to make ends meet by working odd jobs. Maryam ties all her hopes to Ali and see him as a saviour for herself. However, will Ali ever be able to acknowledge his mother's sufferings and give her the freedom she wants?

Cast
Samiya Mumtaz as Maryam Nadir- second wife of Nadir, whom he married in disguise
Asad Malik as Nadir Qayyum- husband of Maryam and Sobia
Zainab Qayyum as Sobia Nadir- first wife of Nadir
Asim Mehmood as Ali- only son of Maryam and Nadir
Moosa as Ali (kid)
Farhana Maqsood as Sadia- daughter of Sobia and Nadir
Saba Bukhari as Sadia (teenage)
Hareeb Farooq as Sohail - son of Sobia and Nadir
Nabeel Shahid as Sohail (teenage)
Haseeb Khan as Wahid- close friend of Nadir
Nasreen Qureshi as Amma Ji- mother of Nadir
Naima Khan as Rasheeda- neighbour of Maryam
Raheela Agha as Bibi Khusrshida- neighbour of Maryam
Ali Anjum as Hamid- nephew of Bibi Khusrshida
Ajmal Deewan as Ubaid- neighbour of Maryam
Maryam Noor as Dua- love interest of Ali
Ali Josh as Amir- friend of Ali
Muazzah Arif as Bano- Maryam's sister
Imran Ahmed- Maryam's brother-in-law and Bano's husband
Qaiser Latif
Aslam Malik
Rana Aftab

Broadcast and release

Broadcast
Ali Ki Ammi premiered on 16 November 2015 . Ali Ki Ammi airs a weekly episode every Monday succeeding Kaanch Ki Guriya, starting from its premiere date, with a time slot of 8:00 pm. It also aired on Geo Kahani, sister channel of Geo Entertainment.

Digital release and streaming service
Ali Ki Ammi was also uploaded on YouTube alongside its airing on TV but later, Geo Network protected all its episodes from YouTube and the series had no episodes available in the Pakistani region. Later in 2019, episodes were reuploaded on the network's official YouTube channel. In September 2019, the drama serial was released on Amazon Prime for streaming in selected regions.

References

External Links

2015 Pakistani television series debuts
Geo TV original programming
Pakistani drama television series
Urdu-language television shows
A&B Entertainment
Pakistani television series endings